Eric Mayfield Evans (born February 27, 1950 in Exeter, New Hampshire) is an American retired slalom canoeist who competed from the late 1960s to the late 1970s. He finished seventh in the K-1 event at the 1972 Summer Olympics in Munich.

References
Sports-reference.com profile

1950 births
American male canoeists
Canoeists at the 1972 Summer Olympics
Living people
Olympic canoeists of the United States